Rock Run is a tributary stream of the Potomac River in Montgomery County, Maryland.

A portion of the stream runs through Rock Run Stream Valley Park, an undeveloped park that is part of the Montgomery County MD park system.

See also
List of rivers of Maryland

References

External links
Rock Run Stream Valley Park, Montgomery County Department of Parks

Rivers of Montgomery County, Maryland
Rivers of Maryland
Tributaries of the Potomac River